One Hundred and One Dalmatians is the soundtrack to the 1961 animated Disney film of the same name. It was recorded on October 5–6, 1960, and is 56:34 in length.  The songs were written by George Bruns and Mel Leven.

Track listing

Critical reception
Allmusic gave the following review:

References

1961 soundtrack albums
Disney animation soundtracks
101 Dalmatians films